OKB is a transliteration of the Russian initials of "" – , meaning 'experiment and design bureau'. During the Soviet era, OKBs were closed institutions working on design and prototyping of advanced technology, usually for military applications. The english language corresponding term for such bureau's occupation is Research and Development.

A bureau was officially identified by a number, and often semi-officially by the name of its lead designer – for example, OKB-51 was led by Pavel Sukhoi, and it eventually became known as the OKB of Sukhoi. Successful and famous bureaus often retained this name even after the death or replacement of their designers.

These relatively small, state-run organisations were not intended for the mass production of aircraft, rockets, or other vehicles or equipment which they designed. However, they usually had the facilities and resources to construct prototypes. Designs accepted by the state were then assigned to factories for mass production.

After the collapse of the Soviet Union, many OKBs became Scientific Production Organizations (NPO). There were some attempts to merge them in the 1990s, and there were widespread amalgamations in 2001–2006 to create "national champions", such as Almaz-Antey to consolidate SAM development.

OKBs in aerospace industry 
 KB-1 – NPO Almaz, Vitaly Shabanov
 OKB-1 – Korolev (today RSC Energia)
 OKB-1 – Dr. Brunolf Baade disbanded by 1953
 OKB-2 – early name of MKB Raduga (OKB-155-2)
 OKB-3 – Bratukhin
 OKB-4 – Matus Bisnovat's Design Bureau (different from NPO Molniya)
 OKB-8 – Novator (long-range SAMs)
 OKB-19 – Shvetsov, Soloviev. Now: "Perm MKB"
 OKB-20 – Klimov, Omsk-Motors
 OKB-21 – Alexeyev
 OKB-23 – Myasishchev (also OKB-482)
 OKB-24 – Mikulin
 OKB-26 – Klimov
 OKB-39 – Ilyushin
 OKB-45 – Klimov
 OKB-47 – Yakovlev originally, transferred to Shcherbakov
 OKB-49 – Beriev
 OKB-51 – Sukhoi
 OKB-52 – Chelomei
 OKB-86 – Bartini
 OKB-115 – Yakovlev
 OKB-117 – Klimov, Izotov
 OKB-120 – Zhdanov (surname)
 OKB-124 – N/A (cooling systems for Tu-121)
 OKB-134 – Vympel
 OKB-140 – N/A (first hydro-alcohol starter-generators for Tu-121)
 OKB-153 – Antonov
 OKB-154 – Kosberg, previously OKB-296
 OKB-155 – Mikoyan (formerly Mikoyan-Gurevich)
 OKB-155-2 – (sometimes designated as OKB-2-155) OKB-155 spin-off in Dubna. Gurevich, Berezniak, Isaev... Now MKB Raduga.
 OKB-156 – Tupolev
 OKB-165 – Lyulka
 OKB-207 – Borovkov and Florov (Borovkov-Florov D, Borovkov-Florov I-207)
 OKB-240 – Yermolaev
 OKB-256 – Tsybin
 OKB-276 – Kuznetsov
 OKB-296 – renamed to OKB-154 in 1946 KB Khimavtomatika
 OKB-300 – Tumansky
 OKB-301 – Lavochkin
 OKB-329 – Mil
 SKB-385 – Makeev
 OKG-456 – Glushko
 OKB-458 – Chetverikov
 OKB-478 – Ivchenko
 OKB-575 – Kovrov
 OKB-586 – Yangel
 OKB-692 – JSC "Khartron" (formerly KB electropriborostroeniya, then NPO "Electropribor")
 OKB-794 – Leninets
 OKB-938 – Kamov

See also 
 Defense industry of Russia

References

External links
 Factories, Research and Design Establishments of the Soviet Defence Industry: a Guide. University of Warwick, Department of Economics.
 Aviation.ru - "OKBs"

Science and technology in the Soviet Union
Science and technology in Russia
Technological races
 

ru:Список конструкторских бюро СССР и России